KZAR (97.7 FM) is an Air 1 affiliate radio station licensed to McQueeney, Texas, United States. The station serves the San Antonio area with a contemporary worship music format. The station is owned by Educational Media Foundation.

History
KZAR began operations in July 1989 as KQRO-FM, a 3 kilowatt class A facility licensed to Cuero, Texas, changing call letters to KVCQ in 1995, KNGT in 2003, and KLTO-FM in 2005. It moved to its current tower, licensed to McQueeney, Texas, and upgraded to the current C1 class by 2008.

When it moved to San Antonio, KLTO-FM broadcast a reggaeton format until 2008, then changed to rock under the "977 Rock" branding.

On February 4, 2011, the station changed formats to top 40 as "Party 97.7". The station's direction leaned towards dance, but played the usual top 40/CHR fare, similar to rivals KXXM and KTFM.

On August 15, 2011, Univision Radio sold KLTO-FM to Educational Media Foundation, which flipped the station to the Air 1 network (which at that time carried a Christian rock format) in mid to late November. Its previous formats could be heard on KBBT HD2 when Univision had it.

See also
List of radio stations in Texas

References

External links

ZAR
Air1 radio stations
Radio stations established in 1989
1989 establishments in Texas
Educational Media Foundation radio stations
ZAR